"Wonderful! Wonderful!" is a popular music song written by Sherman Edwards, with lyrics by Ben Raleigh. The song was first published in 1956.  In the United States, a recording by Johnny Mathis reached number 14 on the Billboard charts. It was Mathis' debut single.

Other versions
In the United Kingdom, Ronnie Hilton recorded a version that reached number 27 on the UK Singles Chart.
In 1963, a recording by the Tymes peaked at number 23 on the R&B charts and number 7 on the U.S. Billboard Hot 100. Their version also spent four weeks at number 2 on the Easy Listening chart and reached number 7 in Canada.
A cover of the song was created for the X-Files episode "Home". The reason a cover was used rather than the original was because when Mathis read the episode's screenplay and saw its graphic content, he refused to allow his version to be used in the episode, thus necessitating a cover. David Nutter, an X-Files producer, originally planned to record the cover himself as he also had a background in music but in the end, another singer was hired because he sounded more like Mathis than Nutter did. The episode's director Kim Manners explains his reason for wanting to use the song because  "certain songs [like 'Wonderful! Wonderful!'] have a creepy, icky quality that none of us have really openly acknowledged".
 American alternative rock band Sebadoh covered the song on their 1991 album Sebadoh III.

References

1956 songs
1956 debut singles
1963 singles
Columbia Records singles
Johnny Mathis songs
The Tymes songs
Songs written by Sherman Edwards
Songs with lyrics by Ben Raleigh